Fimpen (lit. "the cigarette butt", UK Stubby, international The Butt) is a 1974 Swedish family film written and directed by Bo Widerberg and starring Johan Bergman.

Plot
Six-year-old Johan, nicknamed "Fimpen", is an extraordinarily talented football player. He is discovered and recruited to Hammarby IF and the Swedish national team. Performing in the 1974 World Cup qualification, he is promoted to idol status but finds it difficult to keep up in school.

Cast
Johan Bergman as Johan 'Fimpen' Bergman
Monica Zetterlund as Teacher
Magnus Härenstam as Mackan
Ernst-Hugo Järegård as Club Official
Carl Billquist as Principal
Stig Ossian Ericson as Cab Driver

Football players appearing as themselves: Claes Cronqvist, Ralf Edström, Ove Grahn, Georg Ericson, Ronnie Hellström, Kent Karlsson, Ove Kindvall, Krister Kristensson, Bosse Larsson, Benno Magnusson, Roger Magnusson, Björn Nordqvist, Kenneth Ohlsson, Janne Olsson, Örjan Persson, Roland Sandberg, Tom Turesson and Mats Werner.

TV and radio sports commentators appearing as themselves: Bengt Bedrup, Ulf Elfving, Bengt Grive, Arne Hegerfors, Bo Holmström, Lennart Hyland and Sven Lindahl.

References

External links

1974 films
Films directed by Bo Widerberg
Swedish association football films
1970s Swedish-language films
1970s sports films
1970s Swedish films